Alun John Rossiter (born 23 July 1965, in Swindon, England) is a retired speedway rider, and team manager of British Elite League team the Swindon Robins.

Career
Rossiter began his speedway career at Swindon 1982 which he was sponsored by Fred Deane of F&J Transport for many years (Fred Deane of F&J Transport also sponsored Per Sorensen). He raced for a number of clubs during his career including Oxford, Wolverhampton and a successful spell as captain of Poole with whom he won three league titles. He retired from racing after sustaining a serious knee injury during a crash in 2002.

In 2003, Terry Russell bought the promoting rights for the Robins, and soon after Rossiter was installed as co-promoter and team manager.
In 2010 he won the Elite League Championship with the Coventry Bees defeating the Poole Pirates.
In 2012 he won the Elite League Championship with the Swindon Robins defeating the Poole Pirates.
In 2017 he won the Elite League Championship with the Swindon Robins defeating the Wolverhampton Wolves.

References

External links
 Swindon Robins website

1965 births
Living people
Sportspeople from Swindon
Coventry Bees riders
Peterborough Panthers riders
Trelawny Tigers riders
Exeter Falcons riders
Swindon Robins riders
Poole Pirates riders
Oxford Cheetahs riders
King's Lynn Stars riders
Wolverhampton Wolves riders
British speedway riders